also known as Usami Sadayuki (宇佐美定行) (1489 – August 11, 1564) was a Japanese samurai of the Sengoku period, who served the Uesugi clan of Echigo Province.

Also known as Sadakatsu, Sadamitsu was one of Uesugi Kenshin's chief retainers. He was placed in charge of the messengers during the 4th Battle of Kawanakajima.

Samurai
1489 births
1564 deaths
Uesugi retainers
Deaths by drowning